Vivian Suter (born 1949) is a Swiss-Argentinian painter.

Early life
Suter was born in Buenos Aires. Her mother, Elisabeth Wild, was a noted collage artist. At the age of 12, Suter moved to Basel, Switzerland with her family.

Career
In the 1970s she exhibited in a group show at Stampa gallery in Basel, Switzerland. In 1981, she was part of a group exhibition at the Kunsthalle Basel. In 1982 she moved to a former coffee plantation in the rainforest of Panajachel, Guatemala. Suter attracted little critical attention between until 2011, when the curator Adam Szymczyk contacted her to recreate the 1981 group show at the Kunsthalle Basel. Since 2011 she has held numerous significant solo shows in European and North American galleries and museums. Vivian Suter has been awarded the Swiss Grand Award for Art / Prix Meret Oppenheim 2021 by the Federal Office of Culture.

Suter paints in a wall-less open air studio attached to her home. She has been known to use non-traditional materials in her paintings, such as fish glue, volcanic material, soil, botanical matter, and house paint, some of which are reflective of her local environment.

Her work is included in the collections of the Tate, the Museum of Modern Art, Warsaw, and the Kunstmuseum Luzern.

Exhibitions
2021: Kunstmuseum Luzern
2021: Museo Reina Sofía, Madrid
2020: TinTin's Garden, Camden Arts Centre
2019: Tate Liverpool
2019: Institute of Contemporary Art, Boston
2018: Vivian Suter and Elizabeth Wild, The Power Plant, Toronto
2017: Documenta 14, Kassel
2017: Jewish Museum, New York

References

External links

1949 births
Living people
Artists from Buenos Aires
20th-century Swiss women artists
21st-century Swiss women artists
20th-century Argentine women artists
20th-century Argentine artists
21st-century Argentine women artists